Edward John Mott VC DCM (4 July 1893 – 20 October 1967) was an English recipient of the Victoria Cross, the highest and most prestigious award for gallantry in the face of the enemy that can be awarded to British and Commonwealth forces.

Born in Drayton he enlisted in The Border Regiment in 1910, and in 1915, took part in the ill-fated Dardanelles Expedition, after which he served in Egypt and then on the Western Front.

He was 23 years old and a Sergeant in the 1st Battalion, The Border Regiment, British Army when he was awarded the VC.

On 27 January 1917 south of Le Transloy, France, an attack by Sergeant Mott's company was held up at a strong-point by machine-gun fire. Although severely wounded in the eye, Sergeant Mott made a rush for the gun and after a fierce struggle seized the gunner and took him prisoner, capturing the gun. It was due to the dash and initiative of this NCO that the left flank attack succeeded.

The Medal
His Victoria Cross is displayed in the Fitzwilliam Museum in Cambridge.

References

External links
Location of grave and VC medal (Oxfordshire)

1893 births
1967 deaths
Border Regiment soldiers
British Army personnel of World War I
Recipients of the Distinguished Conduct Medal
British World War I recipients of the Victoria Cross
People from Vale of White Horse (district)
British Army recipients of the Victoria Cross
Military personnel from Berkshire